The Protector (Jason Hart) is a superhero who occasionally teams up with the Teen Titans. He somewhat replaces Robin temporarily in the three 1983 The New Teen Titans anti-drug comic specials written by Marv Wolfman and penciled by George Pérez.

Publication history
The first anti-drug special issue was sponsored by Keebler, and Robin was at the time licensed by Nabisco so the Protector was used as a substitute. Coinciding with the issue was an anti-drug cartoon television advertisement that may have been a test for a Titans television show. As Robin was already a member of the popular Super Friends he would not have been available. Despite the fact that the Protector hardly appeared outside of the three anti-drug PSA comics, he is regarded as a member of the team as confirmed in the DC Who's Who Update '87 comic.

Fictional character biography
Jason Hart is a high school student and an expert in sports until the day he discovered that his little cousin Ted got hooked on to some drugs. After his parents tried to talk Ted out of taking the drugs, Jason learned of his love of superheroes and became a superhero called Protector. In order to save Ted, Protector fought the drug dealers which attracted the attention of Nightwing. While making him an honorary member of the Teen Titans, Nightwing trained Protector in the art of hand-to-hand combat.

Jason finally made another appearance attending a superhero party held by Beast Boy. Later, he also appeared in the Infinite Crisis hardcover collected edition in an added two-page spread.

During the Heroes in Crisis storyline, Protector checked himself into Sanctuary to deal with the stress of vigilante work. It was revealed that he has a drug addiction problem. He was among the heroes who was killed in an unexpected attack.

Powers and abilities
Protector is an expert in hand-to-hand combat.

Other versions
The Protector appears in Teen Titans Go! #52 as an alternate alias of Robby Reed. Unknown to both Robby and the Titans, his Hero Dial borrows power from any hero who's in close proximity to him, and thus becomes The Protector when Robin is close by. The Protector appears again in #55, although if it's still Robby Reed is doubtful.

A version of the Protector shows up in Tiny Titans issues #16 and 46.

References

DC Comics superheroes
DC Comics martial artists
Comics characters introduced in 1983
Characters created by George Pérez
Characters created by Marv Wolfman
Vigilante characters in comics